Athira Pharma is a late clinical stage American biopharmaceutical company developing small molecules to restore neuronal health and stop the neurodegeneration brought on by diseases such as Alzheimer's disease and Parkinson's disease. The company's lead candidate, ATH-1017, is in human studies for Alzheimer's disease as of 2021.

The company was founded in 2011 and is headquartered in Seattle. Funding that supports the company is from both public and private investment groups including the Alzheimer's Drug Discovery Foundation, Dolby Family Ventures, the State of Washington's Life Sciences Discovery Fund, The W Fund, WRF Capital, and other private investors.

Leen Kawas served as the company's first President and CEO, but resigned in October 2021, after an independent special committee found she "altered images in scientific papers she authored." On October 21, 2021, Mark Litton, Ph.D., M.B.A. became Chief Executive Officer.

History

The company has received financial support from venture capitalist groups and angel investors through four rounds of funding to date.  Athira Pharma was known as M3 Biotechnology until it underwent a name change on April 11, 2019.

Core technology 
The company's lead asset, ATH-1017, is in human trials of Alzheimer's disease as of 2021. ATH-1017 is a small molecule therapeutic specifically designed to enhance the activity of Hepatocyte Growth Factor (HGF) and its receptor, MET, which are expressed in normal central nervous system function. It aims to regenerate lost connections in the brain, protect brain cells from further damage, and prevent additional neuronal deterioration.  ATH-1017 is currently being tested in two clinical studies: ACT-AD and LIFT-AD.

References

External links

Biotechnology companies of the United States
American companies established in 2011
Companies based in Seattle
2011 establishments in Washington (state)
Biotechnology companies established in 2011